10th Rhode Island Battery was an artillery battery that served in the Union Army during the American Civil War.

Service 
The battery was organized in Providence, Rhode Island in May 1862 and mustered in for three months' service. It was commanded by Captain Edwin C. Gallup.  The battery was formed from volunteers from the Providence Marine Corps of Artillery.

The battery moved to Washington, D.C., May 27–29, 1862 and was attached to Whipple's Command, Military District of Washington. Served duty at Camp Frieze, Tennallytown, until June 23. At Cloud's Mills until June 30, and near Fort Pennsylvania until August.

The 10th Rhode Island Battery mustered out of service August 30, 1862.

See also 

 List of Rhode Island Civil War units
 Rhode Island in the American Civil War

References 
 
 

Military units and formations established in 1862
Military units and formations disestablished in 1862
10th Rhode Island Battery
1862 establishments in Rhode Island
Artillery units and formations of the American Civil War